Audio/Visual is a greatest hits compilation released by Christian rock band Bleach. It was released in October 2005 by Tooth & Nail Records and includes two new songs, "Good to be Alive" and "Must Be Divine". Bleach's final show, performed on August 29, 2004 in Nashville, Tennessee, is included on a bonus DVD.

Track listing

Audio CD
"Good To Be Alive" – 5:02
"Must Be Divine" – 3:45
"Epidermis Girl" – 3:58
"Perfect Family" – 2:54
"Super Good Feeling" – 3:19
"All To You" – 4:21
"Sun Stands Still" – 5:41
"What Will Your Anthem Be" – 5:50
"We Are Tomorrow" – 2:52
"Knocked Out" – 3:17
"Baseline" – 2:47
"Get Up" – 3:10
"December" – 2:48
"Jaded Now" – 4:39
"Girlfriend in a Coma"  (A cover of The Smiths)– 3:08
"Condition" – 3:36
"Clear The Air" – 4:13
"Farewell Old Friends" – 4:37

Bonus DVD
 "Patience"
 "Perfect Family"
 "Found You Out"
 "Rundown Town"
 "Good"
 "Land Of The Lost"
 "Get Up"
 "We Are Tomorrow"
 "Baseline"
 "Super Good Feeling"
 "Sun Stands Still"
 "What Will Your Anthem Be?"

The bonus DVD also includes a music video of "We Are Tomorrow", band photos and fan interviews.

References

Bleach (American band) albums
2002 greatest hits albums
Tooth & Nail Records compilation albums
2002 video albums
2002 live albums
Tooth & Nail Records live albums
Tooth & Nail Records video albums